Phrasaortes was a Persian satrap of Persis under Alexander the Great from circa 330 BCE. He was a son of Rheomithres. Phrasaortes replaced the Achaemenid satrap Ariobarzanes, who had confronted Alexander at the Battle of the Persian Gate, where he was killed.

Phrasaortes died at some point before the return of Alexander from India in 324 BCE. He was replaced by Oxines, a Persian noble, without the permission of Alexander, in a direct challenge to Alexander's authority. Oxines was executed by Alexander, and replaced by the Macedonian general Peucestas.

References

Satraps of the Alexandrian Empire
4th-century BC Iranian people
Ancient Persian people
History of Fars Province